David Morrell may refer to:

David Morrell (born 1943), Canadian-American novelist
David Morrell (actor) (1926–1974), British actor
David Morrell (cricketer) (born 1971), British cricketer
David Morrell (doctor) (1929–2012), British academic general practitioner
David Morrell (boxer) (born 1998), Cuban boxer